LEEP may refer to:

Law Enforcement Exchange Program, program of the Jewish Institute for National Security Affairs involving Israeli and American law enforcement professionals
Legislated Employment Equity Program, which is covered in the article Employment equity (Canada)
Loop electrical excision procedure, surgery that treats cervical dysplasia
LEEP Online Education, Library Education Experimental Program, a distance learning program at the University of Illinois
Large Expanse Extra Perspective, a type of extreme wide-angle stereoscopic lens, developed by Eric Howlett